The Ice Hockey Annual Trophy is an ice hockey trophy in the United Kingdom which is awarded to the British player who has scored the most points during the season in league competition only.

The award is named after the Ice Hockey Annual, an annual publication which is edited by the current chairman of Ice Hockey Journalists UK, Stewart Robinson.

Past winners

References
Ice Hockey Journalists UK

British ice hockey trophies and awards
Annual sporting events in the United Kingdom
Ice Hockey Journalists UK